Deuces is an American crime drama written and directed by Jamal Hill. The film stars Larenz Tate, Meagan Good, Lance Gross and Siya. The film is executive produced by Queen Latifah for her production company Flavor Unit Entertainment. Deuces premiered on Netflix on April 1, 2017.

Synopsis
Detective Jason Foster goes undercover to take down a crime ring that has been impenetrable by the police department for years. However, Foster finds himself drawn in by the unique persona of ringleader Stephen "Deuces" Brooks and the dual life that he leads. The mission is further complicated when Foster's sister Janet also falls under Deuce's spell.

Cast
 Larenz Tate as Stephen “Deuces” Brooks
 Meagan Good as Janet Foster
 Lance Gross as Jason Foster
 Siya as Diggs 
 Antonique Smith as Tanya
 La La Anthony as Detective Sonya Diaz 
 Rick Gonzalez as Papers
 Rotimi as Face 
 Andra Fuller as Detective Solomon Garret

See also 
 List of hood films

References

External links
 
 

2017 films
American crime drama films
Hood films
2010s English-language films
2010s American films